The Maze Runner is the first book in a young-adult post-apocalyptic dystopian science fiction series of novels.

The Maze Runner may also refer to:

 The Maze Runner (book series)
 The Maze Runner (film), the first in a series of film adaptations of the book series
 Maze Runner (film series), the film series